Feeley Peak is a peak,  high, standing  northwest of Sheets Peak, between Davisville Glacier and Quonset Glacier on the north side of the Wisconsin Range in Antarctica. It was mapped by the United States Geological Survey from surveys and U.S. Navy air photos, 1960–64, and was named by the Advisory Committee on Antarctic Names for Keith E. Feeley, a construction mechanic in the Byrd Station winter party, 1959.

References 

Mountains of Marie Byrd Land